Sylvain Bouchard (born April 12, 1970 in Lorretteville, Quebec) is a Canadian long track speed skater. He won the 1000m event at the 1998 World Single Distance Championships. He competed at the 1994 Winter Olympics, finishing 4th at the 500m event and 5th at the 1000m event. He also competed at the 1998 Winter Olympics, finishing 4th on 500m and 5th on 1000m. He earned the world record time in the 1000m event in 1995 and 1998. He retired from competition the same year.

World records
Over the course of his career, Sylvain Bouchard skated two world record:

Source: SpeedSkatingStats.com

References

External links
 Sylvain Bouchard at SpeedSkatingStats.com
 Athlete Profile at Sports Reference

1970 births
Living people
Canadian male speed skaters
Speed skaters from Quebec City
Olympic speed skaters of Canada
Speed skaters at the 1994 Winter Olympics
Speed skaters at the 1998 Winter Olympics
World record setters in speed skating
20th-century Canadian people